Acanthosyris annonagustata is a species of plant in the Santalaceae family. It is endemic to Ecuador.

References

Endemic flora of Ecuador
Santalaceae
Near threatened plants
Taxonomy articles created by Polbot
Plants described in 1998